Joseph D. Moody (November 14, 1841 – November 17, 1909) was a U.S. dentist and served as president of the Historical Society of Southern California.

Moody was born in Ashland, Ohio in 1841. He attended school in Ashland. On November 2, 1861, he enlisted in Co. I, 42nd Ohio Infantry of which regiment James A. Garfield was colonel. For nearly a year, he acted as Garfield's private secretary. Serving for 37 months, he was promoted to the rank of first lieutenant, an mudstered out with that rank.

After leaving the service, he studied dentistry with Dr. Barcklay in Dalton, Ohio, and later completed his course in the Chicago Dental College. In 1869, he married Kate Cameron in Jesup, Iowa, and, after a few years, removed to Mendota, Illinois, where they lived for 20 years. During this period, Moody, in addition to his professional duties, was active in Sunday school work, both in the county and in the state, taking especial interest in the better training of Sunday School teachers, and being the county secretary for some years. For several years he served as president of the city board of education.

In 1893, they moved to Los Angeles, California, and he built up a large and lucrative practice. Moody was prominently identified with Sunday School work, and was for a number of years superintendent of Sunday School normal work in Southern California. He served as president of the Southern California Dental Association, and was at the time of his death lecturer in the Dental Department of the University of Southern California. He was a member of the Los Angeles Academy of Science.

He became a member of the Historical Society of Southern California in 1893 shortly after locating in Los Angeles. He was elected one of the Directors of the Society in 1894. He filled the office of President during the years of 1897 and 1898; also the office of Vice-President several terms, and was a member of the Board of Directors at the time of his death. He contributed a number of valuable historical papers which were published in the Society's collections, among them, "Echoes from the American Revolution." Some African Folk Lore," "How a Woman's Wit Saved California," "Some Aboriginal Alphabets" and "Sequoyah." He died in 1909, his remains taken to Mendota for interment.

References

External links
 

1841 births
1909 deaths
People from Ashland, Ohio
American dentists
Historians from Illinois
People from Wayne County, Ohio
People from Jesup, Iowa
People from Mendota, Illinois
19th-century American historians
19th-century American male writers
20th-century American historians
20th-century American male writers
University of Southern California faculty
Historians from Ohio
Historians from California
19th-century dentists
American male non-fiction writers
Historians from Iowa